The olive-headed lorikeet (Trichoglossus euteles), also called the perfect lorikeet, is a species of parrot in the family Psittaculidae.
It is found in forest, woodland and cultivated areas on Timor and smaller nearby islands.

Description
The olive-headed lorikeet is a mainly green parrot about 24 cm (9.5 in) long. It has an olive coloured head which is demarcated by a green collar. Its beak is orange-red, its irises are red, and its legs are grey. The male and female have an identical external appearance. Juveniles have a slightly greener head, a brown beak, and brown irises.

Aviculture
Like the rainbow lorikeet, this species of lorikeet is popular in aviculture.

Gallery

References

Cited texts

External links
Oriental Bird Images: Olive-headed Lorikeet  Selected photos

olive-headed lorikeet
Birds of the Lesser Sunda Islands
Birds of Timor
olive-headed lorikeet
Taxonomy articles created by Polbot